Yosa de Sobremonte is a locality located in the municipality of Biescas, in Huesca province, Aragon, Spain. As of 2020, it has a population of 28.

Geography 
Yosa de Sobremonte is located 69km north of Huesca.

References

Populated places in the Province of Huesca